Sayburun is a village in the Nurdağı District, Gaziantep Province, Turkey. The village is populated by Yörüks and had a population of 230 in 2022.

References

Villages in Nurdağı District